Breakthrough Artist of the Year may refer to:
Juno Award for Breakthrough Artist of the Year
New Zealand Music Award for Breakthrough Artist of the Year
Breakthrough Artist, an award at Los Premios MTV Latinoamérica